The Church of Santo Tomás (Spanish: Iglesia Colegiata de Santo Tomás) is a church located in Haro, Spain. It was declared Bien de Interés Cultural in 1931.

The façade, designed by Felipe Bigarny, was finished in 1525.

The baroque bell tower was built  under architect Agustín Ruiz de Azcárraga who was commissioned to work on the tower in 1719, and has inspired other buildings such as the Co-cathedral of Santa María de la Redonda or Our Lady of the Assumption Church in Briones.

References 

Bien de Interés Cultural landmarks in La Rioja (Spain)